This is a list of supercouples, fictional couples who have been titled supercouples by the media, usually with the addition of substantial fan support; they may have been referred to as power couples or dynamic duos, and are often defined by a standard set of criteria or circumstances; these circumstances include mania (significant press and media attention being placed on the couple, having to do with charm rather than negativity), the couple being labeled a supercouple by valid sources, the couple having notably impacted popular culture (such as by mania or by becoming a de facto symbol for its genre), and having been
listed as an all-time top romance. Each of these examples have been identified by scholars, critics and press as defining supercouples.

Soap opera

Prime time television

Some notable supercouples within prime time television:

Film

In other media

Comic book

Toys

Notes

References

Supercouples
Supercouples

supercouples